F1 2019 is the official video game of the 2019 Formula One and Formula 2 Championships developed and published by Codemasters. It is the twelfth title in the Formula One series developed by the studio. The game is the eleventh main series installment of the franchise, and it features all twenty-one circuits, twenty drivers and ten teams present in the 2019 Formula One World Championship. Codemasters has stated that the game was in development for nearly two years, and described it as "the most ambitious release in the franchise's history". This game is dedicated to Tony Porter, Niki Lauda, Charlie Whiting, and Anthoine Hubert.

Features
F1 2019 is the first game in the series to feature driver transfers (similar to EA Sports FIFA and Konami Pro Evolution Soccer), with AI-controlled drivers able to switch teams during or at the end of a championship year. These moves will be randomly-generated rather than scripted events.

The game includes 18 Formula 1 cars from F1 2018 from the 1972–2010 seasons, with the DLC having a focus on the careers of Alain Prost and Ayrton Senna. The DLC also includes the 2010 McLaren MP4-25, driven by Lewis Hamilton and Jenson Button, and the 2010 Ferrari F10, driven by Fernando Alonso and Felipe Massa. These cars were included to celebrate the ten-year anniversary of Codemasters releasing the Formula 1 game on the seventh and eighth generations of consoles. Two Ferrari cars, however, are noticeably absent. These are the 2002 Ferrari F2002, and the 1995 Ferrari 412 T2.

Players are able to design liveries—including fictional sponsors—for a generic 2019 car in multiplayer modes.

Within the game Racing Point's SportPesa sponsorship is replaced by SpScore.com (SportPesa's news and live score website) due to SportPesa being a betting company and the game being PEGI 3 rated, as well as regulations on gambling advertising. Scuderia Ferrari's sponsor Mission Winnow was also completely removed because of it being an advertisement for the tobacco company Philip Morris International, as well as A Better Tomorrow branding (run by British American Tobacco) on McLaren cars. In a later update, the 90 Years logos were added, along with the real car, to celebrate Ferrari's 90-year involvement in motorsport.

Codemasters revealed the presence of the FIA Formula 2 Championship in the game, with a Dallara F2 2018 shown at the end of the announcement trailer. The game initially featured the teams, drivers and calendar of the 2018 championship with content based on the 2019 championship added to the game via update in September 2019. The Formula 2 championship is integrated into the game's career mode as a series of three short scenarios designed to introduce driver rivalries, called the F2 Feeder Series. It includes two fictional drivers, Lukas Weber and Devon Butler, who act as teammate and rival to the player character respectively, and they both graduate to Formula 1 alongside the player at the end of the scenario series, with either the player or Butler becoming the champion of the 2018 F2 season. The full Formula 2 championship can be played separately to the career mode.

Reception

F1 2019 was well received.

GameSpot said that "the Formula 2 cars are superb to handle, and the new additions to career mode, like driver swaps, add some much-needed drama and excitement that real Formula 1 has been missing for some time now". Game Revolution said: "There's enough here to take you well into next season (and beyond), while the Career Mode has finally shaken off the cobwebs to emerge as a genuinely thrilling highlight". IGN said that "it definitely doesn't always seem like a new game".

The game got to number 2 in the UK sales chart, behind Crash Team Racing Nitro-Fueled. It reached number 7 in Australia.

The game has been beset by handling and braking issues since the game's release. Codemasters have declined to comment on when a patch will be introduced.

F1 2019 and all other F1 games before it were taken off the Steam, PlayStation, and Xbox Stores in April 2022.

Awards

References

2019 video games
Codemasters games
Ego (game engine) games
Esports games
F1 (video game series)
Linux games
PlayStation 4 games
Racing video games
Video games set in Australia
Video games set in Austria
Video games set in Azerbaijan
Video games set in Bahrain
Video games set in Belgium
Video games set in Brazil
Video games set in Canada
Video games set in China
Video games set in France
Video games set in Germany
Video games set in Hungary
Video games set in Italy
Video games set in Japan
Video games set in Mexico
Video games set in Monaco
Video games set in Russia
Video games set in Singapore
Video games set in Spain
Video games set in Texas
Video games set in the United Arab Emirates
Video games set in the United Kingdom
Windows games
Xbox Cloud Gaming games
Xbox One games
PlayStation 4 Pro enhanced games
Cultural depictions of Ayrton Senna
Multiplayer and single-player video games
Deep Silver games
Video games developed in the United Kingdom